Zen is a school of Mahāyāna Buddhism notable for its emphasis on practice and experiential wisdom.

Zen may also refer to:

Places
ZEN (Palermo), short for Zona Espansione Nord, a quarter in Palermo

People
Zen Gesner (born 1970), an American television and movie actor
Zen Kajihara (born 1966), a Japanese theatre actor
Zen Luzniak, a U.S. soccer defender
Joseph Zen, SDB (born 1932), a Chinese Cardinal of the Catholic Church, the sixth Bishop of Hong Kong
Lezley Zen (born 1974), an American pornstar hailing from Charleston, South Carolina
Reniero Zeno (died 1268), also known as Renier Zen, the 45th Doge of Venice

Arts, entertainment, and media

Fictional entities
 Zen, a sentient computer from the television serial Blake's 7
 Aurelio Zen, Italian police detective and title character of the book series by Michael Dibdin
 Zen the Intergalactic Ninja, a comic book character
 Zen, one of the stepsiblings of the title character in Jacqueline Wilson's novel The Suitcase Kid

Films 
Zen (2009 film), a fictional biography of Zen master Dogen 
Zen (2007 film), a drama film written and directed by Gary Davis
Zen Noir, a 2006 surrealist Buddhist murder mystery by independent filmmaker Marc Rosenbush

Games
Zen Bound, a puzzle game for the iPhone OS developed by Secret Exit
Zen of Sudoku, a Sudoku-based computer game
Zen Pinball, a 3D pinball game for the PlayStation
Zen: Intergalactic Ninja, a 1993 video game from Konami

Music

Groups
Zen (Chinese band), a Chinese rock band
Zen (Dutch band), a Dutch rock band founded by Siegfried 'Siebe' de Jong and Dirk van der Ploeg
Zen Alligators, a short-lived rhythm and blues band that arose out of the ashes of Horslips
Zen Café, a Finnish rock band that was founded in Turku in 1992
Zen Guerrilla, a rock band originally from Newark, Delaware and currently from San Francisco, California
Zen Tricksters, an American Grateful Dead cover band

Albums
Zen (DJ Krush album), the ninth album released by DJ Krush
Zen (Zazie album)
Zen Arcade, the third studio album from the American punk rock band Hüsker Dü, released 1984
Zen: The Music of Fred Katz, 1957 album by Fred Katz
Zen-Nippon East Waste Tour '91, video album produced by the Japanese band The Blue Hearts

Songs
"Zen", a 2013 song by Anitta from the album Anitta
"Zen", a 2020 song by X Ambassadors (with Grandson and K.Flay)

Literature
(Alphabetical by author's surname, then title)

 Zen and the Brain: Toward an Understanding of Meditation and Consciousness (1998), a book by James H. Austin
 Zen in the Art of Writing: Essays on Creativity (1990), a collection of essays by Ray Bradbury 
 Zen: The Religion of the Samurai (1991), a book by Julius Evola
 Zen in the Art of Archery (1948), a short book by Eugen Herrigel
 Zen Shorts (2005), a children's picture book by Jon J. Muth
 Zen and the Art of Motorcycle Maintenance (1974), a philosophical novel by Robert M. Pirsig
 Zen at War (1998), a book by Brian Daizen Victoria

Other uses in arts, entertainment, and media
Zen (TV series), a 2011 TV drama series based on the Aurelio Zen novels by Michael Dibdin
Zen Habits, simplicity blog with more than 130,000 subscribers

Computing, science and technology
Zen (microarchitecture), a processor microarchitecture from AMD
Zen (portable media player), a portable media player designed and manufactured by Creative Technology
Zen (software), computer Go software
Asus Zen UI, a front-end touch interface developed by ASUS with partners
Zen Cart, an open-source online store management system
Zen Coding, a set of plug-ins for text editors
ZEN Vision:M, a portable media player developed by Creative Technology, launched 2005
ZEN Vision W, a portable media player, developed by Creative Technology, released 2006
Zerknüllt (German: zen gene), a Hox gene in the Antennapedia complex
Yandex Zen, a personal recommendations service

Enterprises and organizations
ZEN (department store), an defunct upmarket Thai department store chain owned by Central Group
Zen 49, a group of German artists who came together in Munich in July 1949
Zen Internet, an Internet service provider based in Rochdale, England
Zen Studios (formerly Rubik Interactive), a Hungarian software development company based in Budapest
Zen-Noh, National Federation of Agricultural Co-operative Associations in Japan
Zen-On Music Company Ltd, a music publishing company based in Shinjuku, Tokyo, in Japan.

Transportation and vehicles
Maruti Zen, a car sold in the Indian market by Maruti Suzuki
ZENN, an electric vehicle

Other uses
Chen (surname), romanized as 'Zen' in Wu Chinese
Zen, collateral form of Zeus
ZEN (professional wrestling), a professional wrestling stable in Frontier Martial-Arts Wrestling
FC Zenit Saint Petersburg, abbreviation

See also
Xen (disambiguation)